Waylon Dwayne Francis Box (born 20 September 1990) is a Costa Rican professional footballer who plays as a left-back for Costa Rican club C. S. Herediano  and the Costa Rica national team.

Career

Club career
Waylon Francis began his career in the youth system of Deportivo Saprissa. He made his First Division debut with Brujas on January 13, 2011 in a match against Barrio México. After a brief stay with Brujas he joined Limón, remaining only for one season with the Caribbean club. In 2012, he joined Herediano. He scored the first goal of his career playing for Herediano at Estadio Rommel Fernández in Panama against Tauro FC in the 2012–13 CONCACAF Champions League. He was a high-profile subject of racist slants in a game against Cartaginés, prompting the referee to stop the game.

His play with Herediano in the Champions League drew the attention of Major League Soccer club Columbus Crew SC who made him the club's first signing for the 2014 season. Francis made his MLS and club debut on March 8, 2014 in a 3–0 victory over D.C. United. In 2015, Francis was selected along with two other teammates, to participate in the MLS All-Star Game versus Tottenham Hotspur of the English Premier League. He missed the end of the 2016 season after undergoing surgery on his right shoulder in early October. On December 1, 2017, Crew SC declined Francis' contract option, ending his four-year tenure with the club.

On 14 December 2017, Francis was traded to Seattle Sounders FC for $50,000 of General Allocation Money.

On 5 February 2019, Francis was traded to Columbus Crew SC for $50,000 of General Allocation Money.

Columbus declined their contract option on Francis following their 2020 season. He re-signed with the club on 6 January 2021. Following the 2021 season, Columbus opted to decline their contract option on Francis.

on 3 February 2022, it was announced that Francis had signed a 3 year deal with Herediano to return to his native Costa Rica.

International career
Waylon Francis was part of Costa Rica's Under-23 side. Francis was a part of the team that won the 2013 Copa Centroamericana, in which he made his debut against Nicaragua.

Francis was also a part of the team that reached the quarterfinals at the 2014 FIFA World Cup. Although he did not play, he is famously known for yelling "¡Llore conmigo, papi!" ("Cry with me, daddy!") during an effusive celebration with a sobbing José Miguel Cubero after qualifying to the quarterfinals.

Career statistics

International

Honours
Herediano
 Liga FPD: Clausura 2012, Clausura 2013

Columbus Crew
 MLS Cup: 2020
 Campeones Cup: 2021

Costa Rica
 Copa Centroamericana: 2013

Personal life
Francis was married to Stephanie Gonzales Dávila, but they were divorced in 2016.

Francis earned his U.S. green card in June 2016. This status also qualifies him as a domestic player for MLS roster purposes.

References

External links
 
 
 

1990 births
Living people
People from Limón Province
Association football defenders
Costa Rican footballers
Costa Rica international footballers
2013 Copa Centroamericana players
2014 FIFA World Cup players
Brujas FC players
C.S. Herediano footballers
Columbus Crew players
Seattle Sounders FC players
Tacoma Defiance players
Costa Rican expatriate footballers
Expatriate soccer players in the United States
Major League Soccer players
Major League Soccer All-Stars
USL Championship players
Copa Centroamericana-winning players